Macrocheraia is a genus of bugs in the family Largidae with a single species, Macrocheraia grandis found mainly in Southeast Asia but extending into parts of South Asia. This was referred to in some older literature under the genus Lohita, a name derived from the Sanskrit word for red.

The abdomen of the male is long and extends well beyond the wingtip. The species feeds on a range of plants including those of the families Euphorbiaceae and Malvaceae.

References

Largidae
Hemiptera of Asia
Pentatomomorpha genera
Monotypic insect genera